The 2020–21 season is the Tractor Sport Club's 13th season in the Pro League, and their 12th consecutive season in the top division of Iranian Football. They are also competing in the Hazfi Cup, Super Cup and AFC Champions League.

First team squad
As of 1 November 2020.

Transfers

Summer

In:

Out:

Winter

Competitions

Overview

Persian Gulf Pro League

Standings

Results summary

Results by round

Matches

Hazfi Cup

Super Cup

AFC Champions League

Group stage

Statistics

Squad statistics

See also
 2020–21 Persian Gulf Pro League
 2020–21 Hazfi Cup
 2021 AFC Champions League

External links
 Iran Premier League Statistics
 Persian League

References

Tractor S.C. seasons
Tractor Sazi